Bill Hayes (born July 30, 1952) is a former member of the Ohio House of Representatives, serving the 72nd District from 2011 to 2016.

References

Living people
Ohio State University alumni
Republican Party members of the Ohio House of Representatives
People from Licking County, Ohio
1952 births
Capital University alumni
21st-century American politicians
Politicians from Columbus, Ohio